Platynota yumana is a species of moth of the family Tortricidae. It is found in the United States in Arizona and California.

The wingspan is about 15 mm.

References

Moths described in 1907
Platynota (moth)